Saumitra Saxena (Devanāgarī: , born 1976) is a United States based poet of Indian origin. He is one of the widely read poets of Hindi language of present generation. His critically acclaimed first collection of poems in Hindi titled "Mitra"
meaning "a friend" received the Bharatiya Jnanpith Navlekhan Award in 2008. The book "Mitra" was included in the Library of Congress in 2010 as an important contemporary piece of South Asian literature and is widely distributed across many major libraries of the world. He currently lives in Dayton, Ohio with his wife and a son.

References

External links
Bharatiya Jnanpith

American male poets
Living people
1976 births
21st-century American poets
21st-century American male writers